Butere/Mumias District was an administrative district in the Western Province of Kenya. Its capital town was Butere. The district had a population of 476,928 (1999 census) and an area of 939 km² . In 2010, the district was eliminated and incorporated into Kakamega County.

The district has four constituencies:
Butere Constituency
Khwisero Constituency
Matungu Constituency
Mumias Constituency

External links 
https://web.archive.org/web/20070928022143/http://www.kwaho.org/loc-d-buteremumias.html

 
Former districts of Kenya